Fayu, also known as Sehudate, is a Lakes Plain language of Papua Province, Indonesia spoken by about 1,400 Fayu people. It is spoken in Foida and other nearby villages.

References 

Tariku languages
Languages of western New Guinea